Carolin Reiber (born 2 November 1940) is a German television presenter.

Biography 
Reiber works in Germany as television presenter on German broadcaster ARD and Bayerischer Rundfunk (BR). Television magazines as Jetzt red' i, Unser Land and Die lustigen Musikanten with Maxl Graf were shows with Reiber on German broadcaster BR From 1984 to 1993 she presented on German broadcaster BR magazine Carolins Fleckerlteppich and then from 1993 Bayerntour. On German broadcaster ZDF Reiber presented show Volkstümliche Hitparade and later show Wunschkonzert der Volksmusik. Reiber married Luitpold Maier and has two sons.

Awards 
 1983: Goldene Kamera
 1987: Bambi
 1990: Bambi, special award
 2003: Krone der Volksmusik

External links 

 BAYERNTOUR – das Magazin, das Carolin Reiber gegenwärtig moderiert

References

German television presenters
Television people from Munich
1940 births
Living people
German women television presenters
ZDF people